Norm Woodman (27 July 1902 – 20 July 1968) was an Australian rules footballer who played with Footscray in the Victorian Football League (VFL).

Notes

External links 
		

1902 births
1968 deaths
Australian rules footballers from Victoria (Australia)
Western Bulldogs players
Footscray Football Club (VFA) players